The Day of the Walloon Region or simply the Day of Wallonia is the annual public holiday of Wallonia, the southern region of Belgium. It is celebrated each third Sunday of September and commemorates the participation of the Walloons to the Belgian Revolution in 1830.

See also 
 French Community Holiday

Further reading

External links 
 http://www.fetesdewallonie.be

Wallonia
September observances
Sunday observances
Holidays and observances by scheduling (nth weekday of the month)